Sabine Landau is Professor of Biostatistics at the Institute of Psychiatry, King's College London. Landau was acting and then head of the Biostatistics Department in 2005–2009 and during 2008–2009 was the head of the Mental Health and Neurosciences Clinical Trials Unit.

Landau is a member of the UK Mental Health Research Network's Methodology Research Group and the Royal Statistical Society's General Applications (GAS) committee.

Selected publications

References

21st-century German mathematicians
21st-century women mathematicians
20th-century German mathematicians
20th-century women mathematicians
Academics of King's College London
British women academics
German statisticians
Women statisticians
Living people
Year of birth missing (living people)